The Berkshire Brewers were a minor league baseball team that operated in 1976. They played in the Eastern League. They were affiliated with the Milwaukee Brewers.

After that season, they moved to Holyoke, Massachusetts, where they took the nickname the Millers.

Future Major League Berkshire Brewers
Dick Davis 
Greg Erardi
Gary Holle 
Dan Thomas 
Gary Beare
Barry Cort
Greg Erardi
Sam Hinds

Berkshire Brewers with previous Major League experience
Lafayette Currence
Lary Sorensen

External links
1976 Berkshire Brewers

Defunct Eastern League (1938–present) teams
Defunct baseball teams in Massachusetts
Baseball teams in Pittsfield, Massachusetts
Milwaukee Brewers minor league affiliates
Professional baseball teams in Massachusetts
1976 establishments in Massachusetts
1976 disestablishments in Massachusetts
Baseball teams disestablished in 1976
Baseball teams established in 1949